Berthold II, Duke of Carinthia (c. 1000 – 6 November 1078), also known as Berthold I of Zähringen, was a progenitor of the Swabian House of Zähringen. From 1061 until 1077, he was the Duke of Carinthia and Margrave of Verona.

Life
He was possibly a descendant of one Berthold (or Bezelin) von Villingen (d. 1024), a Swabian count in the Breisgau region and relative of the Ahalolfing dynasty. The early Zähringer were close allies of the Imperial Ottonian dynasty; Berthold von Villingen's son Count Birchtilo was among the nobles capturing and mutilating Antipope John XVI in 998, at the behest of Emperor Otto III. On his mother's side of the family, Berthold probably descended from the Hohenstaufen family, who then ruled as Swabian counts in Ortenau, Thurgau, Breisgau, and Baar.

Berthold quickly rose to be one of the most powerful counts in Swabia, and the Salian emperor Henry III even promised his party-follower the title of Duke of Swabia, then held by Otto of Schweinfurt. However, upon Otto's death in 1057, Henry's widow Agnes of Poitou gave the Duchy of Swabia in fief to Count Rudolf of Rheinfelden. Berthold received, as compensation for the abandonment of his claim, the Duchy of Carinthia and the March of Verona, after the death of the Ezzonid duke Conrad III in 1061. As a result, the Zähringer finally ascended to the status of a princely house.

Berthold remained the only Carinthian duke from the Zähringen dynasty. Both in Carinthia and Verona, like his Ezzonid predecessor, he was considered a foreign ruler and was never really accepted by the local nobles. According to the contemporary chronicler Lambert of Hersfeld, he was even temporarily declared deposed in 1072/1073. Moreover, Berthold fell out with King Henry IV during the fierce Investiture Controversy when, together with Duke Welf I of Bavaria, he supported the election of his former rival Rudolf of Rheinfelden as antiking, after King Henry's Walk to Canossa in 1077. In turn, the king convened the Imperial Diet at Ulm, where he seized the duchy and gave Carinthia to Liutold of Eppenstein, whose grandfather Adalbero had held it until 1035.

Berthold then retired to his Swabian home territory, where he had to ward off constant attacks by King Henry's forces. He died the next year at Limburg Castle and was buried in Hirsau Abbey, where he had backed the construction of the monastery church under Abbot William.

Marriage and children

Berthold married one Richwara, possibly a descendant of Duke Conrad II of Carinthia. The couple had at least three sons:
Herman I ( – 1074), used the Veronese margravial title and became progenitor of the Margraves of Baden
Berthold II ( – 1111), Duke of Swabia in opposition to Frederick of Hohenstaufen from 1092 to 1098, then Duke of Zähringen
Gebhard ( – 1110), Bishop of Constance from 1084.

Richwara also gave birth to two daughters:
Liutgard (d. about 1119), married the Nordgau margrave Diepold of Vohburg; mother of Margrave Diepold III and grandmother of Adelaide of Vohburg, the first wife of Emperor Frederick Barbarossa
Richinza, married Count Rudolf of Frickingen, secondly married to Louis of Sigmaringen, progenitor of the House of Helfenstein.

In his second marriage, Berthold was married to Beatrice, sister of Count Theodoric I of Montbéliard.

In the end, the Zähringer were able to maintain their position, when around 1098 Berthold II reached an agreement with the Hohenstaufen duke Frederick I of Swabia, retaining the title of "Duke of Zähringen". From 1112, Herman II, son of Herman I, ruled as Margrave of Baden.

Notes

References

House of Zähringen
Dukes of Carinthia
1000s births
1078 deaths
Year of birth uncertain